Nuada (Nuadu, Nuadat, Nuadha) is an Irish male name meaning 'the cloud maker' and is borne by several figures from mythology, legend and history, including:

Nuada Airgetlám, king of the Tuatha Dé Danann and presumed deity
Nuadu Finn Fáil, legendary High King of Ireland of the 11th century BC
Nuada Necht, legendary High King of the 2nd century BC
Mug Nuadat, 2nd-century king of Munster
 Prince Nuada, "Silverlance", a fictional character in the 2008 film Hellboy II: The Golden Army  based loosely on the Irish mythology

See also
Delbhna Nuadat, a people of early medieval Ireland
 NUADA, a computer/network simulation management system from THALES

References